Jack Leroy Jennings (April 2, 1918 – February 8, 1982) was an American professional basketball player. He played in the National Basketball League for the Akron Firestone Non-Skids during the 1940–41 season and averaged 4.9 points per game. He also spent one season playing for the Yakima Ramblers in the Pacific Coast Professional Basketball League.

References

1918 births
1982 deaths
Akron Firestone Non-Skids players
American men's basketball players
Basketball coaches from Washington (state)
Basketball players from Washington (state)
Centers (basketball)
Forwards (basketball)
High school basketball coaches in the United States
Sportspeople from Walla Walla, Washington
Washington State Cougars men's basketball players